Bonnegarde is a commune in the Landes department in Nouvelle-Aquitaine in southwestern France.

An ancient fort stands in the village dating back to 1283 and Edward I of England.

Population

See also
Communes of the Landes department

References

Communes of Landes (department)